The Family 1 is a straight-four piston engine that was developed by Opel, a former subsidiary of General Motors and now a subsidiary of PSA Group, to replace the Opel cam-in-head engines for use on mid-range cars from Opel/Vauxhall. Originally produced at the Aspern engine plant, production was moved to the Szentgotthárd engine plant in Hungary with the introduction of the DOHC version. GM do Brasil at São José dos Campos, GMDAT at Bupyeong and GM North America at Toluca also build these engines.

Design
The Family 1 engines are inline-four cylinder engines with belt-driven single or double overhead camshafts in an aluminum cylinder head with a cast iron engine block. GM do Brasil versions were also capable of running on ethanol. These engines share their basic design with the larger Family II engine - for this reason some consider the Family I and Family II to be the same series and instead use the terms 'small block' and 'large block' to distinguish between the two.  Over the years there has been overlap between the two types as the smallest capacities of the Family II have also been manufactured with larger capacity versions of the Family I block.

GM do Brasil specializes in SOHC, petrol-powered and FlexPower (powered with ethanol and/or petrol, mixed in any percentage) engines. GM Brasil also made 16-valve versions of the 1.0 engine. The 1.0 L 16v was available in the Corsa line-up from 1999 to 2001.

SOHC

1.0
The  version has a  bore and a  stroke.

1.2

There are two iterations of the 1.2-liter Family 1 engine. This version, only carburetted, was used in the Opel Corsa. In around 1990 a new, version with  bore and stroke, a narrower bore version of the existing 1.3-litre version, displacing , replaced the original design. This was also available with single-point fuel injection and with catalytic converters.

1.3

The  version has a  bore and a  stroke.

1.4

The  version has a  bore and a  stroke.

1.6

The  version has a  bore and an  stroke.

1.8

The  version has an  bore and an  stroke.

Applications:
 Chevrolet Corsa
 Chevrolet Montana
 Opel Meriva
 Fiat Palio
 Fiat Siena
 Fiat Strada
 Fiat Idea
 Fiat Punto
 Fiat Stilo

SPE / 4
The SPE / 4 or (Smart Performance Economy 4 cylinders) engines are an evolution of the Econo.Flex engines that were made in Brazil at the Joinville plant. There are two available displacements: 1.0 L and 1.4 L. They feature an SOHC head with 2-valves per cylinder, and is fed by a multi-point fuel injection system, which allows it to run on either E100 (pure ethanol) or E25 gasoline (standard in Brazil). Major differences between previous engines include reduced friction, lowered weight, individual coil-near-plug ignition, and  a new cylinder head design.

DOHC

Pre-Ecotec

This was the first engine in this family, featuring a Lotus-developed 16-valve cylinder head and a cast-iron cylinder block which was essentially the same as in Opel's 8-valve engines. C16XE was available only in Corsa GSi, model years 1993 and 1994. C16XE was not yet badged Ecotec, and for later model Corsas and Opel Tigras it was replaced with X16XE Ecotec engine. The main difference between C16XE and X16XE Ecotec is emission control, C16XE lacks  EGR and AIR-system, although the cylinder head is designed to enable these features. Other differences between C16XE and later versions of the engine include intake manifold, C16XE has a plastic upper intake manifold, which was replaced with a cast aluminium manifold, and fuel injection system, C16XE uses Multec fuel injection with MAF sensor and later models used Multec fuel injection with MAP sensor. Also, while C16XE had its own exhaust front section design, for X16XE it was replaced with a front section used also in Opel Astra, probably as a cost-saving measure.

Applications:

 1993–1994 Opel Corsa GSi

Ecotec

The first generation Ecotec engines are belt-driven 16-valve DOHC engines, with cast-iron cylinder blocks and aluminum cross-flow cylinder heads. They feature sodium-filled exhaust valves, a cast steel crankshaft, and a spheroidal graphite flywheel. They also feature exhaust gas recirculation (EGR), secondary air injection, and Multec M engine control with sequential multiport fuel injection. The 1.6 L version was also exported for use in the Brazilian Corsa GSi.

Applications:
 1994–2000 Opel Corsa
 1994–2000 Opel Tigra
 1999–2005 Opel Zafira using Siemens Simtec ECU
 Opel Astra
 Opel Vectra
 2004–2008 Chevrolet Viva
 Fiat Stilo
 Chevrolet Corsa GSi/GLS
 Buick Excelle

Electronic throttle 
Updated version introduced from 2000, with lighter cast-iron cylinder block and camshaft driven by toothed belt. Features EGR valve and electronic throttle for reduced emissions.

Ecotec TwinPort Family 1 engine (Z16XEP) is used in:
 Opel Zafira 2005-2007
 Opel Meriva 2005-2010
 Opel Astra 2003-2004 2004-2007
 Opel Vectra 2006-2008

E-TEC

Daewoo Motors licensed and produced a variant of the Family 1 engine. These engines were built exclusively at Bupyeong engine plant and marketed as E-TEC. Like all Family 1 engines they feature a toothed belt driven valvetrain, a cast-iron engine block and an aluminum cylinder head. Most models feature Euro III-compliancy, and the 1.4 L (1399 cc) and 1.6 L (1598cc) versions employ variable intake geometry. With the release of Chevrolet Cruze, the factory has been converted to produce the Ecotec Family 1 Gen III block.

SOHC

Applications:
 Daewoo Lanos
 Daewoo LeMans
 Daewoo Espero
 Daewoo Nexia
 Chevrolet Lacetti
 Chevrolet Nubira
 Chevrolet Aveo

DOHC
The E-TEC II 16V is an updated version of the E-TEC engines with DOHC.

Applications:
 Chevrolet Aveo
 Daewoo Lacetti
 Daewoo Lanos
 Daewoo Espero
 Daewoo Nexia
 Daewoo Tacuma

Generation III

The new Generation III or Gen III engine entered production in Spring 2005. These engines replaced both the previous generation Ecotec engines as well as Daewoo's E-TEC 16V engines. These engines are manufactured at Szentgotthárd, Hungary, Bupyeoung, Korea, Toluca, Mexico and Yantai, PRC (SGM).

In contrast to their predecessors, the Gen III engines feature lighter cast-iron blocks, as well as higher compression ratios. These engines also implement DCVCP (Double Continuous Variable Cam Phasing technology, a variant of VVT), piston cooling by oil jets, and an integrated catalytic converter. Non-turbocharged variants feature the TwinPort (Variable-length intake manifold) technology.
Reliability improvements include a wider camshaft drive belt, and a water pump no longer driven by it.

The LDE engine meets Euro VI and KULEV emission standards. With the addition of secondary air injection to the LUW engine, the LWE achieves PZEV status.

These engines like their DOHC predecessors feature bucket tappets in contrast to the roller finger followers found on GM's other 4-cylinder engines.

Applications:
 2005-2008 Opel Vectra(Z18XER)
 2005–2019 Opel Zafira
 2005–2012 Opel Astra
 2008–2016 Chevrolet Cruze (1.8L LUW/2H0/LDE/LWE)
 2009–2017 Opel Insignia
 2009–2014 Chevrolet Aveo (1.6L in Europe, 1.6L LXV)
 2012–2018 Chevrolet Sonic (1.8L LUW/LWE in North America)
 2011–2015 Chevrolet Orlando (1.8L 2H0)
 2007–2009 Holden Astra (AH)
 2012–2013 Baojun 630
 Alfa Romeo 159
 2005-2011 Fiat Croma
 2012-2018 Opel Mokka

Turbocharged Gen III engines are used in:
 2006-2009 Opel Meriva (OPC Model)
 2007–2018 Opel Corsa (GSi and OPC Models)
 2008–2012 Opel Insignia
 2010–2015 Buick Excelle GT
 2010–2015 Buick Excelle XT
 2011–2012 Saab 9-5
 2007–2012 Opel Astra
 2012–2017 Buick Verano (1.6 Turbo)
 2012–2020 Chevrolet Sonic (LT, LTZ Models)
 2011–2020 Chevrolet Cruze (China, North America) and Holden Cruze (Australasia)
 2016–present Chevrolet Malibu

See also
 Family II engine
 Family 0 engine
 GM Medium Gasoline Engine
 List of GM engines

References

External links

 http://www.gmpowertrain.com

Family 1
Gasoline engines by model
Straight-four engines